Lady Bian (29 January 161 – 9 July 230), also known as Empress Dowager Bian or Grand Empress Dowager Bian, formally known as Empress Wuxuan, was an empress dowager and later grand empress dowager of the state of Cao Wei during the Three Kingdoms period of China. She was the wife of Cao Cao, a warlord who rose to power in the late Eastern Han dynasty and laid the foundation of Wei. She bore Cao Cao's successor, Cao Pi, who ended the Han Dynasty and founded Wei in 220 after his father's death.

Family background and marriage to Cao Cao
Lady Bian was born in 161 in Bai Village, Qi Commandery (齊郡; in present-day Shandong) although her family was registered in Langya Commandery (琅琊郡; in present-day southeastern Shandong). Because her family was poor, she was a courtesan in a brothel when she was young.  When she was 20, Cao Cao took her as a concubine. In 189, when Cao Cao fled from Dong Zhuo at Luoyang, Yuan Shu spread rumours that Cao Cao had died. Lady Bian refused to believe them and persuaded Cao Cao's followers not to desert him. When Cao Cao returned, he was impressed at her conduct. She birthed him four sons – Cao Pi, Cao Zhang, Cao Zhi and Cao Xiong. After the death of Cao Cao's eldest son Cao Ang, Cao Cao's wife Lady Ding (who was not Cao Ang's biological mother but adopted him as her own) left him, never coming back even after he asked for forgiveness many times. He then made Lady Bian his principal wife. Lady Bian still treated Lady Ding kindly afterward, however. In 219 (after Cao Cao had been made the King of Wei in 216), Emperor Xian of Han made her the Queen of Wei. She was known for her piety, wisdom and humility. She was particularly praised for refusing to celebrate lavishly (as her attendants had suggested) when her son Cao Pi was made heir in 217.

As empress dowager
After Cao Cao died in 220, Cao Pi inherited his title as the King of Wei, and later that year forced Emperor Xian to abdicate in his favour, ending the Han dynasty and establishing the state of Cao Wei. Queen Dowager Bian became empress dowager. She was not much involved in her son's administration or in his campaigns against Cao Wei's  rival states, Eastern Wu and Shu Han. She, in particular, refused to grant her family excessive wealth or titles, setting an example for the rest of Cao Wei's history. One incident that she engaged herself in happened in 226, when Cao Pi wanted to execute Cao Cao's cousin Cao Hong due to previous grudges between them. She, remembering the contributions that Cao Hong had made – including one occasion when he personally had saved Cao Cao's life – rebuked Cao Pi sufficiently that he spared Cao Hong's life, although Cao Hong's offices and titles were still stripped from him.

As grand empress dowager
After Cao Pi died in 226, his son Cao Rui became emperor, and he honoured his grandmother as grand empress dowager. In 227, she was inadvertently insulted by her granddaughter-in-law Princess Yu – Princess Yu had been Cao Rui's wife when he was Prince of Pingyuan, but after he became emperor, he did not make her empress, but made his concubine Lady Mao as empress instead. She was upset, and Empress Dowager Bian tried to console her, and her response was, "the Caos have a tradition for favouring dishonourable women," forgetting that Empress Dowager Bian was formerly a courtesan. Empress Dowager Bian was greatly offended, but did not punish her further than having her sent back to Cao Rui's princely manor house.

Empress Dowager Bian died on 9 July 230. Sometime between 28 July and 26 August 230, she was buried with honours due an empress dowager alongside her husband Cao Cao in the Gaoling (literally "high mausoleum").

See also
 Cao Wei family trees#Lady Bian
 Lists of people of the Three Kingdoms

Notes

References

 Chen, Shou (3rd century). Records of the Three Kingdoms (Sanguozhi).

Bibliography
 
 

159 births
230 deaths
Chinese courtesans
Family of Cao Cao
Cao Wei empresses dowager
2nd-century Chinese women
2nd-century Chinese people
People from Linyi
Chinese grand empresses dowager